Cadiz is an unincorporated community in Bee County, in the U.S. state of Texas. According to the Handbook of Texas, the community had a population of 15 in 2000. It is located within the Beeville micropolitan area.

History
Cadiz was originally called Lapara in the early 1870s. It may have been given that name for the Spanish word la parral, meaning "thicket" or "tangle of vines". R.C. Eeds opened a store in the community and Amos Barker became the pastor at the local Baptist church by the end of the decade. A post office was established at Cadiz in 1892 and remained in operation until 1942. Its population was 50 in 1914 and lost half of it by the early 1930s. At the end of that decade, there were two churches, a store, a gin, and a service station in the community. Mail was then routed to the community from nearby Beeville. It had a population of 15 from the late 1950s through 2000. Community life centered on its local Baptist church.

The Lapara Baptist Church was established on August 12, 1877, by 32 members of the charter. Services were held under a brush arbor and in the local schoolhouse before it was moved to La Para Creek in 1920. It was enlarged to accommodate the growing population. It won the Rural Church of the Year award in 1960. It currently helps disaster victims and supports students of the ministry and participates in Christian crusades. There are only a few houses left in the community today.

Geography

Education
Schoolchildren in the community attended school at the Turner and McCollom homes until a school with three teachers employed was built in the late 1930s. Today, the community is served by the Beeville Independent School District.

References

Unincorporated communities in Bee County, Texas
Unincorporated communities in Texas